"Spicy" is a song by French musician Herve Pagez and American producer Diplo, featuring vocals by English singer-songwriter Charli XCX. The song was released on 30 May 2019 by the Mad Decent record label. "Spicy" heavily interpolates the song "Wannabe" by English girl group Spice Girls, from their first album Spice (1996). The Spice Girls are, therefore, credited as songwriters for the track, alongside Charli XCX, Emmanuel Valere, Joel Jaccoulet and "Wannabe" co-writers Matt Rowe and Richard Stannard. "Spicy" was produced by Pagez and Diplo.

Charts

Release history

References

External links
 

2019 songs
2019 singles
Diplo songs
Charli XCX songs
Spice Girls
Songs written by Charli XCX
Songs written by Emma Bunton
Songs written by Geri Halliwell
Songs written by Mel B
Songs written by Richard Stannard (songwriter)
Songs written by Victoria Beckham
Song recordings produced by Diplo
Songs written by Matt Rowe (songwriter)
Songs written by Melanie C